John Ashworth "Cat" Thompson (February 10, 1906 – October 7, 1990) was an American basketball player.

He won the Utah state championship with Dixie High School team and finished second in the High School National Tournament in 1925. In college, he played for 3 seasons for Montana State, during which time his team had a record of 102-11. In 1929 he won the Helms Foundation Player of the Year award and his team won Helms National Championship . He averaged 15.4 points per game when the average team scored 40 points per game.

He was named All-America in 1927, 1928, 1929 and 1930. He scored 1,539 points in 100 career college games he played. He was enshrined in the Naismith Memorial Basketball Hall of Fame in 1962.

A 2009 ESPN College Basketball Encyclopedia named Thompson "one of the five greatest college hoops players of the first half of the 20th century"

References

External links
Basketball Hall of Fame page on Thompson
Cat Thompson Website provided by his family

1906 births
1990 deaths
All-American college men's basketball players
American men's basketball players
Basketball players from Utah
Montana State Bobcats men's basketball players
Naismith Memorial Basketball Hall of Fame inductees
National Collegiate Basketball Hall of Fame inductees
People from St. George, Utah
Forwards (basketball)